Olo is a restaurant in Helsinki, Finland, founded by Pekka Terävä, Petri Lukkarinen and Timo Sailama in 2006. It is located on Pohjoisesplanadi 5 in central Helsinki. Olo was awarded one Michelin star in 2011. The Finnish gastronomical society chose Olo as the restaurant of the year in 2009.

Sources
 Terävä, Vesivalo, Laakio, Helin: Aistin tarkkuudella 2010 - OLOn tarina
 Kaapro, Laura: Pekka Terävä ei aio muuttaa Oloa, Helsingin Sanomat, 17 March 2011. Accessed 11 July 2011.

External links
 Official website

Restaurants in Helsinki
Michelin Guide starred restaurants in Finland
Restaurants established in 2006